Virginija Kalinauskaitė  (born 27 January 1957, in Panevėžys) is a Lithuanian graphic artist.

Biography
In 1983, she graduated from the Lithuanian Institute of Art. Since 2001, she was Vilnius Graphic Art Centre and Gallery director.  She is a member of the Lithuanian Artists' Association.

Works
Her work is etchings. They are characterized by virtuoso painting, subtle gray shadings, flamboyance ("Landscape with hay haystack" 1986, "Rose," "The Journey" "Circles," all in 1989, "Women" in 1994, "Two riders," 1999 on).
He also creates aquatint, linocut free cutting behavior ("Rain," "Gypsy," both in 1984) Nuliejo watercolors. Since 1984 participates in exhibitions in Lithuania (the individual in Vilnius in 1986, 1990, in Panevezys in 1999, Panevezys Civic Art Gallery 2009) and abroad (international bookplate exhibition in Paris in 1990), Istanbul, Turkey.

Illustrated books
 Ramutė Skučaitė. Wood Gifts 1985
 Julia Švabaitė-Gyliene. Gabriuko records in 1993
 Emilia Liegutė. Jim is a good dog, 2000, 2004, Rudžiukė
 Vytautas Račickas. Nippon wants to home: the girl that he loved dad in 2004
 Nijole Riaubaitė. Spider predators. Vilnius, Club 13 and Ko, 2006 
 Nijole Riaubaitė. Princess civilization. Vilnius, Gilija, 2005 
 Maria Dunowska, Teresa Kolenda. Polish language textbook in class II, Light, 2007
 Virginija Kalinauskaitė, РIЗНОБАРВНI БАЙКИ. РIЗНОБАРВНI БАЙКИ. 2008

See also
List of Lithuanian painters

References

External links
"Virginija Kalinauskaitė", Vikipedija

Lithuanian painters
1957 births
Living people
Kalinauskaite
20th-century Lithuanian women artists
21st-century Lithuanian women artists